This is a list of past and present members of the Senate of Canada representing the province of Ontario. Ontario has had an allocation of 24 senators since the time of Confederation. The province is also one of four regional Senate divisions under Section 26 of the Constitution Act that allows for the expansion of the Senate by one or two senators per region.

Current senators

Historical

Notes

References

See also
Lists of Canadian senators

 
Ontario
Senators